Autódromo Santiago Yaco Guarnieri is a  motorsports circuit located in Chaco, Argentina. It has hosted events in the TC 2000 and Formula Renault series. The track is located on low ground, and can be flooded very easily. On rainy days the circuit facilities can be under water, preventing the normal development of activities.

Lap records 

The official race lap records at the Autódromo Santiago Yaco Guarnieri are listed as:

References

Motorsport venues in Chaco Province